The 2018–19 St. Francis Brooklyn Terriers women's basketball team represented St. Francis College during the 2018–19 NCAA Division I women's basketball season.  The Terrier's home games were played at the Generoso Pope Athletic Complex. The team has been a member of the Northeast Conference since 1988. St. Francis Brooklyn is coached by Linda Cimino, who was in her first year at the helm of the Terriers.

The Terriers finished the season 18–13 overall and 12–6 in conference play. The 12 conference victories are the most in program history, the previous best was 10 set by the 2013–14 squad. The Terriers were the 3 seed in the NEC tournament and hosted 6 seed Mount St. Mary's. The Terriers lost 74–80 in the opening round of the NEC Tournament.

Of note, Amy O'Neill became the first Terrier to record a triple-double. She did so twice during the season, first at Sacred Heart (2/2/19) and again at home against LIU Brooklyn (2/16/19).

Roster

Schedule

|-
!colspan=12 style="background:#0038A8; border: 2px solid #CE1126;;color:#FFFFFF;"| Non-Conference Regular Season

  

 

|-
!colspan=12 style="background:#0038A8; border: 2px solid #CE1126;;color:#FFFFFF;"| Northeast Conference Regular Season

   

  

  

   
|-
!colspan=12 style="background:#0038A8; border: 2px solid #CE1126;;color:#FFFFFF;"| Northeast Conference tournament

|-

Accolades and records

Amy O'Neill, senior guard
Set record for most Assists in a season for St. Francis Brooklyn Terriers and the Northeast Conference (268)
Recorded the programs first triple-double at Sacred Heart on February 2, 2019 (13 pts, 13 rebs, 12 assists)
Set Terrier record for most assists in a game, 13 (February 11, 2019 & February 25, 2019)
Selected first team All-NEC
Selected to All-ECAC Honorable Mention
Selected to the 2019 Division I-AAA Athletics Directors Association Scholar-Athlete Team
Led NCAA Division I in assists per game (8.6)
Led the NEC in steals (69)

Jade Johnson, junior guard
Selected second team All-NEC
Set Terrier record for most points in a season (598)
 
Ebony Horton, freshman guard
Selected to the NEC All-Rookie Team

See also
2018–19 St. Francis Brooklyn Terriers men's basketball team

References

St. Francis Brooklyn
St. Francis Brooklyn Terriers women's basketball seasons
Saint Francis Brooklyn Terriers women's basketball
Saint Francis Brooklyn Terriers women's basketball